Grammonota tabuna, the sheet-web spiders, is a species of dwarf spider in the family Linyphiidae. It is found in Costa Rica and Panama.

References

Linyphiidae
Articles created by Qbugbot
Spiders described in 1970